Alan Graham Frew (born November 8, 1956) is a Scottish-Canadian singer, songwriter, actor, and author, who is the lead singer of the Canadian rock band Glass Tiger. He has also released three solo albums.

Early life
Born 8 November 1956 in Coatbridge, Scotland, Frew moved to Newmarket, Ontario at age 16 with his family.

Musical career
In 1983, Frew and others formed Glass Tiger. In 1986, the band released its first album, The Thin Red Line. Two of its songs, "Don't Forget Me (When I'm Gone)" and "Someday", reached the Top 10 in the U.S. charts. The Thin Red Line went quadruple platinum in Canada and gold in the United States. Glass Tiger was nominated for a Grammy Award for Best New Artist in 1987 and has won five Canadian Juno Awards. 

Frew and Stephan Moccio co-wrote "I Believe", which "became the theme song for Canada's Olympic Broadcast Consortium for the 2010 Winter Games in Vancouver" and "Free to Be", which is used by the Toronto Maple Leafs as their theme song.

Frew portrayed the character Ewan McCauley in the 2010 Canadian comedy film GravyTrain.

Personal life
On 20 August 2015, Frew suffered a stroke causing trauma to his right side. As of January 2018, Frew had made a full recovery.

Awards and recognition
Frew has received the Queen's Diamond Jubilee Medal "in recognition of his service to the Canadian arts, and for his dedication to helping poverty-stricken children". With co-writer Sharon Brenna, Frew wrote The Action Sandwich: A Six Step Recipe for Success by Doing What You're Already Doing, a 2007 autobiography.

Discography

Solo albums
Hold On (1994)
Wonderland (2000)
80290 Rewind (2015)

with Glass Tiger
 The Thin Red Line (1986)
 Diamond Sun (1988)
 Simple Mission (1991)
 31 (2018)
 33 (2019)

Solo singles
Healing Hands (1994) [#8 CAN]
So Blind (1995)

References

External links
Alan Frew official site. Retrieved 26 February 2010

1956 births
Living people
Canadian rock singers
Canadian male singers
Musicians from Ontario
Canadian male film actors
Glass Tiger members
People from Coatbridge
Scottish emigrants to Canada
Scottish expatriates in Canada